Wyoming is the name of some places in the U.S. state of Wisconsin:
Wyoming, Iowa County, Wisconsin, a town
Wyoming, Waupaca County, Wisconsin, a town
Wyoming (community), Wisconsin, an unincorporated community